The Living EP is the first EP from The band Josephine Collective on the Warner Bros. record company. Produced by the legendary John Feldmann it is a "perfect blend of stuck-in-your-head choruses and smooth melodies". "Living" is the prelude to Josephine Collective's debut full length on Warner Brothers Records We Are The Air.

"Living" - 3:14
"Lye" - 2:57
"Crack My Heart" - 3:49
"We Killed The American Dream" - 3:39

http://www.smartpunk.com/product.php?item_id=21758

2007 EPs